"Lost in Love" is a 1985 ballad by R&B/pop group New Edition, and is the third single from their eponymous second album, New Edition. Released in early 1985, the song peaked at #35 on the Billboard Hot 100 and #6 on Billboard's Hot Black Singles chart.

Charts

References

1985 singles
New Edition songs
1985 songs
Contemporary R&B ballads